This article is a list of notable people from Vlorë in southern Albania:

Businessmen 
• Sinan Idrizi - businessman and major shareholder of Air Albania, Albania’s flag carrier.

Politics 
Ismail Qemali – Albanian Independence Movement
Ali Asllani – Poet and diplomat
Mehmed Ferid Pasha-Grand Vizier of the Ottoman Empire
Skënder Gjinushi - politician
Qazim Koculi – Albanian Independence Movement
Lütfi Pasha-Grand Vizier of the Ottoman Empire
Arben Malaj –  politician
Manush Myftiu - Albanian Communist Politician
Harilla Papajorgji - politician
Kemankeş Mustafa Pasha - Grand Vizier of the Ottoman Empire
Eqrem Vlora – Albanian Independence Movement
Syrja Vlora - Albanian Independence Movement signatory and major Albanian landowner

Religious leaders 
 Ahmet Myftar - 6th Dedebaba of the Bektashi Order (born in Brataj, Vlorë County)
 Baba Mondi - Bektashi World Leader and Albanian Bektashi Cleric

Cinema 
Kristaq Mitro – Film director
Ibrahim Muçaj – Film director
Drita Pelingu – film and stage actress
Orli Shuka - British-Albanian actor born in Vlorë.

Musicians 
Alban Skenderaj – Singer
Aurela Gaçe – Singer
Kristaq Paspali – Operatic tenor

Sports 
Aldo Guna — football player 
Sokol Kushta – Former football player of Partizani, Flamurtari and of Albania's national team
Viktor Mitrou – Weightlifter
Perlat Musta – Former football goalkeeper of Partizani's team, and of Albania's national team
Geri Cipi – Former football player of Albania's national team
Igli Tare – Former football player of Albania's national team
Suela Mëhilli - alpinist

References 

 
Vlorë